Dušan Jovanović (born 5 June 1971) is a retired footballer who played as a forward for clubs in Greece.

Playing career
Jovanović spent most of his career playing for clubs in the Greek second division, including Pontii Veria F.C., Panetolikos F.C., Panserraikos F.C. and Panachaiki F.C. He helped Panachaiki gain promotion to the Greek Superleague and would play the following season in the top flight with the club.

In June 2000, he moved to Panionios G.S.S. on a two-year contract.

References

External links
ΞΕΝΟΙ ΠΑΙΚΤΕΣ ΚΑΙ ΠΡΟΠΟΝΗΤΕΣ ΤΗΣ ΠΑΝΑΧΑΪΚΗΣ

1971 births
Living people
Serbian footballers
Panetolikos F.C. players
Panserraikos F.C. players
Panachaiki F.C. players
Panionios F.C. players
Mediterranean Games gold medalists for Yugoslavia
Competitors at the 1971 Mediterranean Games
Association football forwards
Mediterranean Games medalists in football